Ziaul Haque Mollah is a Bangladesh Nationalist Party politician and the former Member of Parliament of Bogra-4.

Career
Mollah was elected to parliament from Bogra-4 as a Bangladesh Nationalist Party candidate in 2001.

References

Bangladesh Nationalist Party politicians
Living people
8th Jatiya Sangsad members
People from Bogra District
6th Jatiya Sangsad members
7th Jatiya Sangsad members
Year of birth missing (living people)